"Nobody Else" is the debut single by American singer Tyrese Gibson. It was written by Gibson along with Jake Carter, Trevor Job, Joe Sayles, and Kevin Scott for his self-titled debut studio album (1998), while production was helmed by Carter. Released as his debut with RCA Records, the single reached number 36 on the Billboard Hot 100 and number 12 on the Hot R&B/Hip-Hop Songs chart.

Track listings

Credits and personnel

 Ben Arrindell – mixing 
 Jake Carter – production, writer
 Tyrese Gibson – vocals, writer

 Trevor Job – bass, writer
 Joe Sayles – writer
 Kevin Scott – writer

Charts

Weekly charts

Year-end charts

References

1999 singles
Tyrese Gibson songs
Songs written by Tyrese Gibson
1998 songs
RCA Records singles